Mayme Farmer Irwin Logsdon (February 1, 1881–July 4, 1967) was an American mathematician known for her research in algebraic geometry and mathematics education. She was the first woman to receive tenure in the University of Chicago mathematics department.

Career 
Logsdon taught at a high school from 1900 to 1911 before returning school herself. She earned a Ph.B., S.M., and Ph.D. in mathematics from the University of Chicago in 1913, 1915, and 1921 respectively. Her doctoral advisor was L. E. Dickson. She taught at Hastings College from 1913 to 1917 and at Northwestern University from 1917 to 1919. She then returned to her alma mater in 1921 where she was the only female regular faculty member above the rank of instructor until 1982 when Karen Uhlenbeck was appointed professor of mathematics. Logsdon remained at the University of Chicago for a large portion of her career, until 1946. She concluded her career at the University of Miami, retiring in 1961.

Phd students at the University of Chicago include Anna A. Stafford (Henriques), James Edward Case, Clyde Harvey Graves, and Frank Ayres, Jr.

She wrote two texts Elementary Mathematical Analysis (1932 volume 1 and 1933 volume 2) and A Mathematician Explains (1st edition 1935; 2nd edition 1936) both for undergraduate mathematics.

Logsdon was a fellow of the International Education Board, a member of the American Association for the Advancement of Science, the American Mathematical Society, the Mathematical Association of America, and the director of the American Association of University Women (1929-1935).

References 

1881 births
1967 deaths
American women mathematicians
20th-century American mathematicians
University of Chicago alumni
Hastings College faculty
Northwestern University faculty
University of Miami faculty
Fellows of the American Mathematical Society
20th-century women mathematicians
20th-century American women
University of Chicago faculty